Jogger's Park is a seaside jogging track along with a park in Bandra, Mumbai. It is situated at the southern end of the Carter Road. The park was opened to the public on 27 May 1990 and receives more than 2000 visitors on weekdays and double the number on Sundays. Its jogging track is 400 metres long. It features a mud strip for running and two paved tracks for walking or jogging.

Development of the park is credited to the city's veteran hockey coach and former corporator, Oliver Andrade. Andrade's effort to rope in films star Dilip Kumar and Sunil Dutt, transformed the site from a dumping ground into a jogging track. The movie star's fund raising efforts led to financial assistance from the Rahejas, the Lokhandwalas and the Rizvi builders at a cost of ₹4 crore. In his memory, a plaque at the entrance of the park reads "From Sir with Love". Mumbai's first laughter club was launched at Joggers Park.

On 11th Feb 2022, the BMC passed a proposal to rename the Jogger's Park as Sir Oliver Andrade Park.

History
Joggers Park was conceived by Oliver Andrade of Bandra, Bombay. Oliver Andrade was fondly called "Sir" as he was responsible for coaching Hockey and Football to thousands of students of St. Theresa's Boys High School, St. Stanislaus High School and Sacred Heart Boys High School. Andrade wanted to develop a park for the citizens on a plot of land facing the sea in Bandra, which had turned into a dump yard over the years. He approached various eminent citizens of Mumbai, notably, Sunil Dutt, Dilip Kumar and pursued with various local and state authorities to get his plan sanctioned. 
As soon as he received a go-ahead from the authorities, Andrade raised money for the park by convincing the leading three construction companies who were located in Bandra. As a result of his effort, Lokhandwala Builders agreed to develop the cost pro bono. The external wall facing the sea was developed pro bono by Raheja Builders and Rizvi Builders. The founders of all these companies were former students of Andrade and they were happy to invest money in a cause that was for the citizens of Bombay.

Park Management
The Lokhandwala family agreed to manage the day-to-day operations and maintenance of the park. The family's trust Bombay Suburban Civic Trust was the official caretaker of the park, having obtained the rights to manage the park from the Bombay Municipal Corporation. The MCGM regained control of the park from the Bombay Suburban Civic Trust on 31 January 2017.

Entry Fee
The park does not charge an entry fee since 1 February 2017. When the park was inaugurated, the entry fee was ₹1 which was increased to ₹2 a decade later. The original timings of the park (until 31 January 2017) was 5:30 AM to 9:30AM and 3:30PM to 9:00PM. However, after the takeover by the MCGM, the cooling time in the afternoon has been withdrawn and the park is open from 5:00AM to 9:00PM.

Save Joggers Park
Citizens and Joggers united under the banner of a spontaneous movement to save the park on 2 February 2017. This movement evolved into the Save Joggers Park Group which is pursuing the agenda of the upkeep of the park. The Save Joggers Park group includes thousands of patrons and users of the Joggers park. They have also initiated dialogues with elected representatives, municipal authorities and officials of the Garden department of MCGM.

References

Parks in Mumbai
Bandra